Al Jawf or Al Jouf may refer to:

 Al Jawf Region, a region of Saudi Arabia
 Dumat al-Jandal, Al-Jawf or Al-Jouf, the ruined former capital city of Al Jawf Region
 Sakakah, the capital city of Al Jawf Region
 Al Jawf Governorate, a governorate of Yemen
 Al Jawf, Libya, a town in Kufra, Libya